The Hans Hass Fifty Fathoms Award was founded in 2002 by Leslie Leaney of the Historical Diving Society in the United States. It is awarded in recognition of contribution to the advancement of our knowledge of the ocean. The award consists of a personalized Fifty Fathoms watch together with a framed cast bronze plaque, designed by ocean artist Wyland, which depicts Hans Hass wearing an oxygen rebreather during his solo 1949 Red Sea expedition.

Criteria 
The criteria for nomination requires that individuals or organisations who, in the spirit of Hans Hass’ pioneering work in the fields of underwater science, technology, arts and literature, have excelled at an international level in any of those fields. 

It is presented by the Historical Diving Society and since 2013 has been sponsored by the Swiss watch manufacturer Blancpain.

Award Winners 
Source: Hans Hass Institute
 2003: Ernie Brooks II (USA), photographer
 2004: James Cameron (USA), diver and filmmaker
 2005: Daniel Mercier, (France), underwater Film and Photography
 2006: Stan Waterman, (USA),underwater Film and Photography
 2007: Bev Morgan, (USA), dive equipment manufacturer; David Attenborough, (England), broadcaster, biologist, natural historian and author.  
 2010: Sylvia Earle, (USA), marine scientist 
 2012: Laurent Ballesta, (France), technical diver and film maker
 2014: Weicheng Cui, (China), designer of deep ocean submersible Jiaolong and deep ocean technology
 2016: Howard and Michele Hall, (USA),underwater film and photography
 2018: Franz Bruemmer, (Germany), marine scientist and President of Verband Deutscher Sporttaucher (VDST)

See also
 List of environmental awards 
 List of oceanography awards

References

Oceanography awards
Environmental sciences awards
Underwater diving awards
American awards
Awards established in 2003